Danila Andreyevich Yezhkov (born 7 August 2001) is a Russian football player. He plays for FC Sokol Saratov.

Club career
He made his debut in the Russian Football National League for FC Veles Moscow on 29 August 2021 in a game against FC Akron Tolyatti.

References

External links
 
 Profile by Russian Football National League

2001 births
Living people
Russian footballers
Association football forwards
FC Rubin Kazan players
FC Veles Moscow players
FC Sokol Saratov players
Russian Second League players
Russian First League players